American rock band Linkin Park has recorded material for seven studio albums, the most recent being One More Light, in 2017. The band was formed in Los Angeles, California in 1996 by high school friends Mike Shinoda, Rob Bourdon and Brad Delson. The group later expanded to a six-piece when they added Joe Hahn, Dave "Phoenix" Farrell and Mark Wakefield to the line-up. Mark Wakefield was later changed to lead vocalist Chester Bennington. After facing numerous rejections from several major record labels, Linkin Park turned to Jeff Blue for additional help. After failing to catch Warner Bros. Records attention on three previous attempts, Jeff Blue, now the vice president of Warner Bros. Records, helped the band sign a deal with the company in 1999. The band released its breakthrough album, Hybrid Theory, the following year. The album spawned four singles, "One Step Closer", "Crawling", "Papercut" and "In the End". The album included a total of twelve songs, with two additional special edition tracks available in Japan. Later in 2002, the band released a remix album, Reanimation, which would include works from Hybrid Theory and non-album tracks. Reanimation debuted on July 30, 2002, featuring the likes of Black Thought, Jonathan Davis, Aaron Lewis and many others. Reanimation claimed the second spot on the Billboard 200 and sold nearly 270,000 copies during its debut week. The remix album included twenty remixed songs, mainly hip hop-influenced.

Following the success of the two releases, the band released Meteora in early 2003. Meteora spawned five singles, "Somewhere I Belong", "Faint", "Numb", "From the Inside" and "Breaking the Habit", which received significant radio attention. The album included twelve songs which included some non-single hits like "Session" and "Lying from You". "Lying from You" peaked on the Alternative Songs charts. "Session", an instrumental track from the album, was nominated for a Grammy Award for Best Rock Instrumental Performance in 2004. The band then released a mashup CD/DVD set, "Collision Course", with rapper Jay-Z on November 30, 2004. It reached number 1 on the Billboard 200 upon its release. The extended set contained six songs recorded overnight. The song "Dirt off Your Shoulder/Lying from You", being a non-single, charted in the UK single charts. Linkin Park returned to the recording studios in 2006 to work on new material. To produce the album, the band chose producer Rick Rubin. Despite initially stating the album would debut sometime in 2006, it was delayed until 2007. Warner Bros. Records officially announced that the band's third studio album, Minutes to Midnight, would be released on May 15, 2007 in the United States. After spending fourteen months working on the album, the band members opted to further refine their album by removing five of the original seventeen tracks. Minutes to Midnight sold over 625,000 copies in its first week, making it one of the most successful debut-week albums in recent years. The album also took the top spot on the Billboard charts. The album included the singles "What I've Done", "Shadow of the Day", "Bleed It Out", "Given Up" and "Leave Out All the Rest". The album contained politically-concerned and environmentally-concerned songs such as "Hands Held High", "No More Sorrow" and "What I've Done".

In May 2009, Linkin Park announced they were working on a fourth studio album, which was planned to be released in 2010. Mike Shinoda told IGN that the new album would be 'genre-busting', while building off of elements in Minutes to Midnight. He also mentioned that the album would be more experimental and "hopefully more cutting-edge". Chester Bennington also addressed the media to confirm Rick Rubin would return to produce the new album. The band later revealed that the album would be called A Thousand Suns. While working on the new album, Linkin Park worked with film composer Hans Zimmer to produce the score for Transformers: Revenge of the Fallen. The band released a single for the movie, titled "New Divide". Joe Hahn created a music video for the song, featuring clips from the film. On June 22, Linkin Park played a short set in Westwood Village after the premier of the movie. After completing work for Transformers: Revenge of the Fallen, the band returned to the studio to finalize their album. The album featured four singles, "The Catalyst", "Waiting for the End", "Burning in the Skies" and "Iridescent". For the next album, the band again started recording in 2011, and the album Living Things was released in June 2012. The album sold about 223,000 copies during its debut week, reaching No. 1 on the US Album Charts. Linkin Park's single "Castle of Glass" was nominated for 'Best Song in a Game' at the 2012 Spike Video Game Awards. The band also performed at the award ceremony on December 7 but lost the award to "Cities" by Beck. The album featured four singles, "Burn It Down", "Lost in the Echo", "Powerless" and "Castle of Glass". On August 10, 2013, the band collaborated with American musician Steve Aoki to record the song "A Light That Never Comes" for Linkin Park's online puzzle-action game LP Recharge (short for Linkin Park Recharge), which was launched on Facebook and the official LP Recharge website on September 12, 2013. On the day of the game's release, Linkin Park made a post on their Facebook explaining that the song used to promote the game would be included on a new remix album, Recharged. The band also worked on the soundtrack for the film Mall, which was directed by Joe Hahn.

In 2014, the band released an album, The Hunting Party, which features a more raw and loud sound compared to their other albums. The album is the first one to have featuring artists like Page Hamilton of Helmet, Rakim, Daron Malakian of System of a Down and Tom Morello of Rage Against the Machine. The album spawned five singles, "Guilty All the Same", "Until It's Gone", "Wastelands", "Rebellion" and "Final Masquerade".

In 2017, the band released their most recent album One More Light, which features a drastic sound change. The album was described as pop, pop rock, electropop, and electronic rock. The album features Pusha T, Stormzy, and Kiiara. The album spawned three singles, "Heavy", "Talking to Myself", and "One More Light". This is the last album to feature lead singer Chester Bennington before his death in July 2017.

Songs

Notes

References

 
Linkin Park